Erling Olsen may refer to:
 Erling Olsen (politician), Danish
 Erling Olsen (trade unionist), Norwegian